Iravum Pagalum Varum is a 2015 Indian Tamil-language heist film directed by Bala Sriram in his directorial debut. The film stars Mahesh, Ananya, and Jagan, while A. Venkatesh, Sanjana Singh, Yuvarani, and Swaminathan play supporting roles. The music was composed by Dhina with cinematography by E. Krishnasamy. The film released on 20 March 2015.

Plot 
Karthi is a college student who indulges in petty thieving. When he is caught, he admits that he does it to meet his pocket expenses. This gets him entangled in the affairs of a ruthless and dishonest police officer who runs his own gang of thieves.

Cast 
 Mahesh as Karthi
 Ananya as Sona
 Jagan as Karthi's friend
 A. Venkatesh
 Sanjana Singh as Hamsa
 Yuvarani
 Swaminathan
 Shakeela

Production 
Iravum Pagalum Varum is the directorial debut of Bala Sriram, and was produced by Balasubramaniam Periyasamy. Cinematography was handled by E. Krishnasamy, and the music was composed by Dhina and lyrics written by Lalithanand.

Soundtrack

Reception 
Malini Mannath of The New Indian Express said that the film, "despite the director’s effort to present a freshness in its screenplay and narration, fails to touch a chord". She called it "a case of good intention gone haywire." Maalai Malar and Dinamalar also gave the film negative reviews.

References

External links 
 

2015 films
2010s heist films
2010s Tamil-language films
Indian crime films
Indian heist films
2015 directorial debut films